The 5th Quarter is a 2011 American drama film written, directed and produced by Rick Bieber and starring Aidan Quinn, Andie MacDowell, and Ryan Merriman.

The option of the film was an interest to Ryan Johnston, a co-producer of the film, who was responsible in raising the $6.7 million dollars to produce the film. Rick Bieber then wrote the script with permission of the Abbate family, and proceeded to move forward with casting and location scouting.   The film was funded in early 2008 and pre-production began in Winston-Salem, North Carolina in late-August, 2008. Filming began in October 2008, and concluded in November.

Background
The plot is based on a true story, dealing with the events of the Wake Forest football team's 2006 season. Luke Abbate's parents set up a foundation in his honor, which gives scholarships to deserving students from Luke's high school and helps families deal with issues around reckless teenage driving.

Plot
Luke Abbate is a popular high school athlete, who plays lacrosse and football. When the 15-year-old dies in a car accident caused by a reckless teenage driver after lacrosse practice in February 2006, Luke's older brother, Jon Abbate, is motivated to have the Wake Forest Demon Deacons football team be successful in their upcoming season. The man died from a reckless car accident and the brother decided it was a successful idea to try harder.

Cast
 Ryan Merriman as Jon Abbate
 Aidan Quinn as Steven Abbate
 Andie MacDowell as Maryanne Abbate
 Sammy Nagi Njuguna as Josh Gattis
 Andrea Powell as Bonnie
 Stefan Guy as Luke Abbate
 Jillian Batherson as Haley Scott
 Michael Harding as Coach Jim Grobe
 Anessa Ramsey as Lynn Garber
 Patrick Stogner as Henry
 Bonnie Johnson as Joan Kinsey

Soundtrack
 "Mind On Your Music" by Mama's Gravy
 "I Don't Wanna Know" by Mama's Gravy 
 "Right At Home" by Mama's Gravy 
 "Something More" by SupaPhat
 "Less Than Zero" by Black Mercies
 "Taken It All Away" by Katy J.
 "Drowning Song" by Lorraine Maher
 "Man Of Conviction" by Mama's Gravy

Reception 
Robert Koehler of Variety called it "poorly written and directed at the most basic levels". Kirk Honeycutt of The Hollywood Reporter wrote, "This real-life football story fumbles the ball at every decisive juncture."

See also
 Jon Abbate

References

External links
 
 
 making the 5th quarter [an interview with rick bieber] at BibleDude.net

2011 films
2011 biographical drama films
2010s sports drama films
American biographical drama films
American football films
American sports drama films
Sports films based on actual events
Films set in 2006
Films set in North Carolina
Films shot in North Carolina
2006 Atlantic Coast Conference football season
Wake Forest Demon Deacons football
2011 drama films
2010s English-language films
2010s American films